Love, Dance and a Thousand Songs (German: Liebe, Tanz und 1000 Schlager) is a 1955 West German musical comedy film directed by Paul Martin and starring Caterina Valente, Peter Alexander and Rudolf Platte. It is a revue film, showcasing a number of different performers. It was filmed at the Spandau Studios in West Berlin and on location around Mittenwald in Bavaria. The film's sets were designed by the art directors Hans Jürgen Kiebach and Gabriel Pellon.

Cast
 Caterina Valente as Caterina
 Peter Alexander as  Peter Alexander
 Rudolf Platte as Hugo Sauer
 Ruth Stephan as Wicky Winkler
 John W. Bubbles as John 
 Werner Fuetterer as 	Heidemann
 Silvio Francesco as 	Silvio 
 Hubert von Meyerinck as 	Director Winkler
 Henry Lorenzen as 	Paul
 Joachim Rake as 	Herr Osterhagen
 Erik van Aro as Aro 
 Bruno W. Pantel as 	Herr Mallwitz 
 Willy A. Kleinau as Luigi
 Sunshine Quartett as 	Themselves
 Das Comedian Quartett as Themselves
 James and Cornell Jackson as 	Themselves
 Kurt Edelhagen as Orchester Kurt Edelhagen
 Hazy Osterwald as 	Orchester Hazy Osterwald
 Wandy Tworek as Geiger Tworek 
 Die 3 Hill Billys as 	Musiker
 Bill Ramsey as 	Singer
 Jonny Teupen as Musiker
 Albert Vossen as 	Musiker
 Walter Bluhm as 	Fernsehreporter 
 Wolf Harnisch as Inspizient

References

Bibliography
 Bock, Hans-Michael & Bergfelder, Tim. The Concise CineGraph. Encyclopedia of German Cinema. Berghahn Books, 2009.
 Kapczynski, Jennifer M. & Richardson, Michael D. A New History of German Cinema. Boydell & Brewer, 2014.

External links 
 

1955 films
1955 musical films
German musical films
West German films
1950s German-language films
Films directed by Paul Martin
1950s German films
Gloria Film films
Films shot at Spandau Studios
Films shot in Bavaria

de:Liebe, Tanz und 1000 Schlager